Paul Lavanga (3 October 1910 – 5 January 1996) was a French modern pentathlete. He competed at the 1936 Summer Olympics.

References

External links
 

1910 births
1996 deaths
French male modern pentathletes
Olympic modern pentathletes of France
Modern pentathletes at the 1936 Summer Olympics
Sportspeople from Pyrénées-Orientales
20th-century French people